This is an incomplete list of mines in British Columbia, Canada and includes operating and closed mines, as well as proposed mines at an advanced stage of development (e.g. mining permits applied for). Mines that are in operation are in bold. Past producers which are under re-exploitation, re-development and/or re-promotion are in italics. Also in italics are major projects under development or subject to controversy.

See also
List of ghost towns in British Columbia

References

Mines
British Columbia